Massimo Mida (1917–1992) was an Italian screenwriter and film director.

Selected filmography
 A Pilot Returns (1942)
 Behind Closed Shutters (1951)
 At the Edge of the City (1953)
 Good Folk's Sunday (1953)
 Chronicle of Poor Lovers (1954)
 The Prince with the Red Mask (1955)

References

Bibliography 
 Torunn Haaland. Italian Neorealist Cinema. Edinburgh University Press, 2012.

External links 
 

1917 births
1992 deaths
20th-century Italian screenwriters
Italian male screenwriters
Italian film directors
20th-century Italian male writers